Lučane is a village in the municipality of Bujanovac, Serbia. According to the 2002 census, the town has a population of 1091 people. Of these, 1089 (99,81 %) were ethnic Albanians, 1 (0,09 %) Serb and 1 (0,09 %) other.

References

Populated places in Pčinja District
Albanian communities in Serbia